Don Peyote is a 2014 American comedy film written and directed by Dan Fogler and Michael Canzoniero.  It stars Fogler as a slacker who has a spiritual awakening and becomes obsessed with conspiracy theories.

Plot 

Warren (Dan Fogler) is an unemployed artist and pot head who has crazy dreams. That is the only remarkable thing about him until a day comes when a crazy homeless man confronts him on the street. From that day on, Warren descends into himself, insanity and a confusion of mind and body, spurred on by drugs, along with Doomsday and conspiracy theories.

Cast
 Dan Fogler as Warren Allman
 Josh Duhamel
 Jay Baruchel as Bates
 Wallace Shawn as Psychotherapist
 Kelly Hutchinson as Karen
 Yang Miller as Balance
 Anne Hathaway as Agent of TRUTH
 Topher Grace as Glavin Culpepper
 Annabella Sciorra as Giulietta
 Abel Ferrara as Taxi cab driver
 Daniel Pinchbeck as himself
 William Leroy as Nazi Sex Addict
 Gavin Octavien as Extra

Production 
Fogler recruited the large cast of cameos in part by allowing them to co-write their characters and improvise.  The film was shot between 2010 and 2013.

Release 
XLrator gave Don Peyote a limited release on May 16, 2014, and released it on DVD on July 8, 2014.

Reception 
Rotten Tomatoes, a review aggregator, reports that only one of thirteen surveyed critics (8%) gave the film a positive rating; the average rating was 3.5/10.  Metacritic rated it 14/100 based on eight reviews.  Sheri Linden of The Hollywood Reporter wrote, "To call Don Peyote a mess would be putting too fine a point on it. The hallucinatory odyssey of a conspiracy-theory-obsessed New Yorker is a bad trip, destination nowhere."  Daniel M. Gold of The New York Times called it "a cautionary tale of drug-fueled decline" that may not have been realized by its creators.  Gary Goldstein of the Los Angeles Times called it "a tedious, incoherent look at a paranoid stoner's emotional and spiritual unraveling".  Calum Marsh of The Village Voice wrote that the film  becomes increasingly incomprehensible as time goes on.  Christopher Schobert of Indiewire rated it D and wrote, "Perhaps in the hands of a Charlie Kaufman or Michel Gondry, this story could move beyond the unexceptional, but in Fogler's hands, Don Peyote is a slow-moving dirge."  Vadim Rizov of The Dissolve rated it 0/5 stars and wrote, "In practice, Dan Fogler's sophomore directorial effort (co-directed/written by Michael Canzoniero) is merely execrable, segueing incoherently from one stand-alone fragment of a terrible movie to another."  Matt Donato of We Got This Covered rated it 2.5/5 stars and wrote, "Don Peyote is a delusional, hallucinogenic journey into the mind of an apocalypse obsessed lunatic – a jumbled puzzle of ideas missing a few crucial connections."

References

External links 
 
 
 

2014 films
2014 comedy films
American comedy films
American films about cannabis
Films about conspiracy theories
2010s English-language films
2010s American films